Kay Sharon McConney is a Barbadian politician in the Barbados Labour Party (BLP). She is a senator in the Senate of Barbados. She currently serves as the Minister of Education, Technological and Vocational Training in the Mia Mottley administration.

References 

Living people
21st-century Barbadian politicians
Barbados Labour Party politicians
Government ministers of Barbados
21st-century Barbadian women politicians
Year of birth missing (living people)